The Taiheiyo Masters, titled since 2001 as the  for sponsorship reasons, is a professional golf tournament on the Japan Golf Tour. Founded in 1972, it was promoted as the Pacific Masters and for a few years was the richest golf tournament in the world with a prize fund of US$300,000. It remains one of the richest tournaments in Japan, attracting some of the leading international golfers.

The tournament was played at Sobu Country Club near Inzai, Chiba until 1976. Since 1977 it has been contested on Taiheiyo Club's Gotemba Course near Gotemba, Shizuoka. Its title sponsors are Sumitomo Mitsui Banking Corporation and Visa. Previous names include Taiheiyo Club Masters, Toshiba Taiheiyo Masters, Visa Taiheiyo Club Masters, and Sumitomo Visa Taiheiyo Masters.

The inaugural tournament went into a playoff between America's Gay Brewer and Australia's David Graham. It was a three-hole aggregate playoff, the first ever instituted in a golf tournament. Before that, playoffs were either decided in a full round or sudden death. Brewer won the event.

Tournament hosts

Winners

Note: Green highlight indicates scoring records
Sources:

Notes

References

External links
Coverage on the Japan Golf Tour's official site
Official site 

Japan Golf Tour events
Golf tournaments in Japan
Sport in Shizuoka Prefecture
Gotemba, Shizuoka
Sumitomo Mitsui Financial Group
Recurring sporting events established in 1972
1972 establishments in Japan